Quaregna was a comune (municipality) in the Province of Biella in the Italian region Piedmont, located about  northeast of Turin and about  northwest of Biella.

As a comune Quaregna bordered the following municipalities: Cerreto Castello, Cossato, Piatto, Valdengo, Vallanzengo, Valle San Nicolao.

History 
From 1 January 2019 Quaregna was absorbed by the new-born municipality of Quaregna Cerreto.

Demographic evolution

References

Cities and towns in Piedmont
Former municipalities of the Province of Biella